Yakoruda Municipality is a municipality in Blagoevgrad Province in southwestern Bulgaria.

Demographics
Of all the people who answered the question on their religion, 77% declared Muslim. Most of those Muslims are the so-called Pomaks, or Bulgarian Muslims but they tend to declare themselves as Turkish people.

Religion
According to the latest Bulgarian census of 2011, the religious composition, among those who answered the optional question on religious identification, was the following:

References

External links

Municipalities in Blagoevgrad Province